Thiophene-3-acetic acid is an organosulfur compound with the formula HO2CCH2C4H3S. It is a white solid.  It is one of two isomers of thiophene acetic acid, the other being thiophene-2-acetic acid.

Thiophene-3-acetic acid has attracted attention as a precursor to functionalized derivatives of polythiophene.

References

Thiophenes
Acetic acids